Ap Lei Chau or Aberdeen Island is an island of Hong Kong, located off Hong Kong Island next to Aberdeen Harbour and Aberdeen Channel. It has an area of  after land reclamation. Administratively it is part of the Southern District. Ap Lei Chau is one of the most densely populated islands on earth, as well as the most densely populated island with a population of over 10,000.

In the 2000s on their website the Guinness World Records called it the world's most densely populated island.

History
Before the First Opium War, Ap Lei Chau was a small fishing village, with its harbour forming an excellent natural typhoon shelter. The island appears on a Ming-era map with its primary settlement labelled "Fragrant Harbour Village". This is the probable origin of the name for Hong Kong, although the town eventually took the name of its island.

Under the terms of the 1841 Treaty of Nanking, it was ceded to the British together with Hong Kong Island. It was sometimes known as Taplichan, Taplishan, &c. from an alternative name for the island.

The island had a largely uneventful history under British rule.

In 1968, Hongkong Electric opened a power station on Ap Lei Chau to provide electricity for the whole of Hong Kong Island. In 1980 and 1994, a bridge was constructed to connect the island to the Hong Kong Island, and this created momentum for rapid economic development. Public housing estates were built to accommodate people, including some who had suffered in a fire in the Aberdeen typhoon shelter. In 1989, the generators of the power station were relocated to Lamma Island, and the old power station was demolished. The site was re-developed into the South Horizons residential area, with the addition of some land reclaimed from the sea.

Geography and demographics

Ap Lei Chau was named after the shape of the island, which resembles the tongue of a duck. Ap means duck, Lei means tongue, and Chau means island. The northern part has the highest population, while the southern part of the island is less densely populated.

The highest point on the island is Yuk Kwai Shan (玉桂山; aka.

It comprises four main residential areas — Lei Tung Estate, Ap Lei Chau Main Street, South Horizons and Ap Lei Chau Estate, each of which comprises several highrise towers. There is an industrial estate on the southern tip of the island.

The population of Ap Lei Chau is 79,727.

Ap Lei Chau also lends its name to the Ap Lei Chau geologic formation, which covers most of Hong Kong Island.

Places of interest

The Hung Shing Temple located on Hung Shing Street, off Main Street, Ap Lei Chau, is a notable site. Dating back to 1773, it is the oldest temple in the Aberdeen and Ap Lei Chau areas and is a declared monument.

The Shui Yuet Temple aka. Kwun Yum Temple is located at No. 181 Main Street, Ap Lei Chau. Dedicated to Kwun Yum, it was built at the end of the 19th century and is a Grade III historic building. The temple site is adjacent to the site of the former Aberdeen Police Station. Clearly chosen for its fung shui, the superior dragons were seen as being protection from the 'threat of the tiger's jaw' from the police station. Although the police station has now been demolished, the dragons are still present and seen as enduring feng shui guards. Apart from Kwun Yum, the temple also houses Kwan Tai, Tin Hau, Chai Kung and Wong Tai Sin.

Transport

Ap Lei Chau and Hong Kong Island are connected by the four-lane Ap Lei Chau Bridges. Opened in 1983, it originally only had two lanes, and was widened to four in 1994 with a duplicated bridge to the northwest of the original one.

Buses are the main form of transport for the residents in Ap Lei Chau. Bus routes depart from the six bus termini on the island to various places on Hong Kong Island and in Kowloon:
 Ap Lei Chau Estate
 Ap Lei Chau (Lee Lok Street) and Ap Lei Chau (Lee King Street) in the industrial area
 Ap Lei Chau Main Street 
 Lei Tung Estate
 South Horizons

Green minibuses and taxis are available. Red minibuses are prohibited from entering the island.

There is a regular sampan service running between Ap Lei Chau Main Street and Aberdeen. (Service hours: 6am-12am)

The MTR South Island line opened on 28 December 2016 links Admiralty of Hong Kong Island to Ap Lei Chau by the Aberdeen Channel Bridge, to the southeast of the Ap Lei Chau Bridges. There are two stations on the island: Lei Tung (for Lei Tung Estate and Ap Lei Chau Main Street) and South Horizons (for South Horizons, Ap Lei Chau Estate and Ap Lei Chau Industrial Estate) serving the development of the same name.

Education
Ap Lei Chau is in Primary One Admission (POA) School Net 18. Within the school net are multiple aided schools (operated independently but funded with government money) and Hong Kong Southern District Government
Primary School.

Community issues
Since Ap Lei Chau is currently the fourth most densely populated island in the world, public space is highly insufficient. In 2016, the Hong Kong Government reallocated the waterfront land of the former Hong Kong Driving School on Lee Nam Road for building luxury apartments, ignoring the suggestion of the locals and intensified the problem of insufficient land use.

See also

 Ap Lei Pai
 List of places in Hong Kong
 List of islands and peninsulas of Hong Kong
 Shek Pai Wan
 Magazine Island

References

Further reading

External links

 History and Memories of Ap Lei Chau

 
Southern District, Hong Kong
Restricted areas of Hong Kong red public minibus
Islands of Hong Kong
Populated places in Hong Kong